Tipella, also historically known as Tipella City, is a locality near the head of Harrison Lake in southwestern British Columbia, Canada.  A real estate venture from the early 20th Century, the development of a "city" never came to fruition though the placename remains on maps today, and is the name of the airstrip nearby, which serves Port Douglas and nearby logging camps.  It is also the source of the name of Tipella Indian Reserve No. 7, which is one of the reserves of the Douglas First Nation, and of Tipella Creek, which enters Harrison Lake at the foot of the locality.

References
BCGNIS entry "Tipella (locality)"
BCGNIS entry "Tipella Indian Reserve 7"
BCGNIS entry "Tipella Creek"

Unincorporated settlements in British Columbia
Lillooet Country
Lower Mainland
Ghost towns in British Columbia